The Fayrer Baronetcy, of Devonshire Street in St Marylebone in the County of London, was a title in the Baronetage of the United Kingdom. It was created on 11 February 1896 for the physician Joseph Fayrer. The baronetcy became extinct on the death of the 4th Baronet in 2017. The family surname was pronounced "Fairer".

Fayrer baronets, of Devonshire Street (1896)
Sir Joseph Fayrer, 1st Baronet (1824–1907)
Sir Joseph Fayrer, 2nd Baronet (1859–1937)
Sir Joseph Herbert Spens Fayrer, 3rd Baronet (1899–1976)
Sir John Lang Macpherson Fayrer, 4th Baronet (18 October 1944 – 9 March 2017)

The baronetcy became extinct on the death of the fourth baronet.

Arms

Notes

References
Kidd, Charles, Williamson, David (editors). Debrett's Peerage and Baronetage (1990 edition). New York: St Martin's Press, 1990, 

Fayrer